Albert Edward Heming (13 June 1910 – 3 January 1987) was awarded the George Cross for the heroism  displayed on 2 March 1945 in Parkers Row in Bermondsey, London when he dug a trapped priest from the ruins of a bombed Catholic Church. He was a section leader in the Civil Defence Rescue Service at the time. Notice of his award appeared in the London Gazette on 17 July 1945.

References 

 Hissey, Terry - Come if ye Dare - The Civil Defence George Crosses, (2008), Civil Defence Assn

Ted was section leader of an ARP station in Bermondsey when the blast was heard. He knew the church (Dockland Roman Catholic) and the four priests inside Frs Stephen Spillane, Finbarr McCarthy, Michael O'Riordan and Edmund Arbuthnott. Despite the presence of gas and the imminent collapse of the building (the ARP regional commissioner Sir Edward Evans had ordered Ted to withdraw previously) Ted tunnelled 30 feet to Fr Arbuthnott who had a serious head injury and broken arm.

1910 births
1993 deaths
Irish recipients of the George Cross
Irish people of World War II